Amaro Manuel Raposo Antunes (born 27 November 1990) is a Portuguese cyclist, who last rode for UCI Continental team . In May 2019, he was named in the startlist for the 2019 Giro d'Italia. On 2 March 2023, he was suspended for doping retrospectively from 5 December 2022 until 5 December 2026 by the UCI. Some of his results including the 2017 and 2021 Volta a Portugal overall wins were then annuled.

Major results

2008
 National Junior Road Championships
1st  Road race
1st  Time trial
2011
 1st Stage 5 Toscana-Terra di Ciclismo
2014
 9th Overall Volta ao Alentejo
 9th Overall Volta a Portugal
2015
 4th Road race, National Road Championships
 10th Overall Volta a Portugal
2016
 1st Mountains classification Volta ao Alentejo
 4th Road race, National Road Championships
 6th Overall Volta a Portugal
 7th Overall Volta Internacional Cova da Beira
 10th Overall Volta ao Algarve
2017
 1st  Overall Troféu Joaquim Agostinho
1st  Points classification
1st  Mountains classification
1st  Combination classification
1st Stage 2
 1st Clássica da Arrábida
 1st  Overall Volta a Portugal
1st  Mountains classification
1st Stage 9
 5th Overall Volta ao Algarve
1st Stage 5
 5th Clássica Aldeias do Xisto
 8th Overall GP Beiras e Serra da Estrela
2018
 1st  Overall Tour of Małopolska
1st Stage 3
 2nd Giro dell'Appennino
 4th Overall Sibiu Cycling Tour
1st Stage 3a (TTT)
 10th Overall Volta a la Comunitat Valenciana
 10th Overall Szlakiem Grodów Piastowskich
2019
 5th Time trial, National Road Championships
 8th Overall Volta ao Algarve
2020
 1st  Overall Volta a Portugal
1st Stage 2 
 10th Overall Volta ao Algarve
2021
 1st  Overall Volta a Portugal

Grand Tour general classification results timeline

See also
Doping in sport
List of doping cases in cycling

References

External links

1990 births
Living people
Portuguese male cyclists
People from Vila Real de Santo António
Volta a Portugal winners
Sportspeople from Faro District